This table displays the top-rated primetime television series of the 1979–80 season as measured by Nielsen Media Research.

References

1979 in American television
1980 in American television
1979-related lists
1980-related lists
Lists of American television series